Huang Dongping (born 30 April 1995) is a Chinese badminton player. She is the reigning mixed doubles Olympic Champion, and was two-time mixed doubles Asian Champion winning in 2018 and 2019.

Career 

Huang competed at the 2020 Summer Olympics partnering with Wang Yilyu as the second seeds. The duo won a gold medal after beating their compatriots Zheng Siwei and Huang Yaqiong in the final in a close rubber game. Huang played at the 2021 Sudirman Cup in Vantaa, Finland, and was part of the China squad that lifted the Sudirman Cup trophy.

Achievements

Olympic Games 
Mixed doubles

BWF World Championships 
Mixed doubles

Asian Games 
Mixed doubles

Asian Championships 
Women's doubles

Mixed doubles

BWF World Junior Championships 
Girls' doubles

Mixed doubles

Asian Junior Championships 
Girls' doubles

Mixed doubles

BWF World Tour (11 titles, 18 runners-up) 
The BWF World Tour, which was announced on 19 March 2017, and implemented in 2018, is a series of elite badminton tournaments sanctioned by the Badminton World Federation (BWF). The BWF World Tour is divided into levels of World Tour Finals, Super 1000, Super 750, Super 500, Super 300 (part of the BWF World Tour), and the BWF Tour Super 100.

Women's doubles

Mixed doubles

BWF Superseries (1 title, 3 runners-up) 
The BWF Superseries, which was launched on 14 December 2006, and implemented in 2007, was a series of elite badminton tournaments, sanctioned by the Badminton World Federation (BWF). BWF Superseries levels were Superseries and Superseries Premier. A season of Superseries consisted of twelve tournaments around the world that had been introduced since 2011. Successful players were invited to the Superseries Finals, which were held at the end of each year.

Women's doubles

Mixed doubles

  BWF Superseries Finals tournament
  BWF Superseries Premier tournament
  BWF Superseries tournament

BWF Grand Prix (5 titles, 2 runners-up) 
The BWF Grand Prix had two levels, the Grand Prix and Grand Prix Gold. It was a series of badminton tournaments sanctioned by the Badminton World Federation (BWF) and played between 2007 and 2017.

Women's doubles

Mixed doubles

  BWF Grand Prix Gold tournament
  BWF Grand Prix tournament

BWF International Challenge/Series (1 runner-up) 
Mixed doubles

  BWF International Challenge tournament
  BWF International Series tournament

References

External links 

 

1995 births
Living people
Sportspeople from Quanzhou
Badminton players from Fujian
Chinese female badminton players
Badminton players at the 2020 Summer Olympics
Olympic badminton players of China
Olympic gold medalists for China
Olympic medalists in badminton
Medalists at the 2020 Summer Olympics
Badminton players at the 2018 Asian Games
Asian Games silver medalists for China
Asian Games bronze medalists for China
Asian Games medalists in badminton
Medalists at the 2018 Asian Games
World No. 1 badminton players